Francisca Xavier Queiroz de Jesus, known professionally as Chica Xavier (January 22, 1932 – August 8, 2020), was a Brazilian actress and producer. Xavier worked in stage, film, and television. She was known primarily for her work in Rede Globo's telenovelas, but was active in stage for 60 years. Xavier was born in Salvador, Bahia. She was married to actor Clementino Kelé.

Xavier started working at 14 years as bookbinder at the Official Press of the State of Bahia. She moved to Rio de Janeiro in 1953 and studied theater with Pascoal Carlos Magno. Her theater debut was on September 25, 1956 at the Teatro Municipal. Xavier acted in Orfeu da Conceição alongside Haroldo Costa, Léa Garcia, Cyro Monteiro, Dirce Paiva, Clementino Kelé, among others. Xavier played the role of Dama Negra, which symbolized Death; she recited verses from Vinícius de Moraes and danced to atabaques, or Afro-Brazilian drumming.

Xavier's film debut was in Assalto ao Trem Pagador in 1962, directed by Roberto Farias. She then worked in several Rede Globo productions. In 1973 Xavier debuted on TV in the telenovela Os Ossos do Barão. She played more than 50 characters on television, and was a cast member in Sinhá Moça, Dancin' Days, Renascer, Pátria Minha, Força de um Desejo, and the miniseries Tenda dos Milagres, where she played the mãe-de-santo Magé Bassã.

Xavier published Chica Xavier canta sua prosa: Cantigas, louvações e rezas para os orixás in 1999. The book had a preface by her friend Miguel Falabella, and was illustrated by her daughter Izabela d'Oxóssi. She was the subject of a biography in 2013 by Teresa Montero titled Chica Xavier: Mãe do Brasil. Xavier was born at a Candomblé terreiro, or temple. She was the leader of a Candomblé religious community in Rio de Janeiro, the Cercado de Boiadeiro.

Filmography

References

External links

1936 births
2020 deaths
People from Salvador, Bahia
Afro-Brazilian actresses
Brazilian television actresses
Brazilian telenovela actresses
Brazilian film actresses